The Blackwater River in Tasman flows due north along a long straight valley, parallel to and equidistant from, the Matakitaki and Tutaki Rivers, reaching the Mangles River just to the east of the town of Murchison.

References

Rivers of the Tasman District
Rivers of New Zealand